Jasper Newell is an American child actor. He is best known for his role in the 2011 film We Need to Talk About Kevin. His most recent role was in the 2017 world premiere of Richard Maxwell's play Samara at Soho Rep in New York City.

Filmography
Slap Back Jack: High Five Master (Animated short) (voice)
Wonder Pets (TV series) (voice)
Dora the Explorer (TV series) (voice)
Primetime: What Would You Do? (TV series)
We Need to Talk About Kevin (film) 
The Drowning (film) 
Keep Me Where The Light Is (short)

Other works
Einstein on the Beach (opera, 2012 production) – "The Boy"
Before Your Very Eyes (play, 2015 production)

References

American male child actors
American male film actors
Living people
Year of birth missing (living people)